Kendrick Jevon Dean (also known as Wyldcard) is an American record producer, songwriter and entrepreneur. He has produced or written for 7 GRAMMY Nominated albums to date. Some of his hits include Chris Brown's "Say Goodbye" (Billboard #1), Mariah Carey's "I Stay In Love" and Trey Songz "Last Time". Kendrick began his music career in 2004 when he was first credited as a producer on mega group Destiny's Child final album Destiny Fulfilled. A former high school history teacher, and University of Florida graduate; Dean used his classical, jazz and gospel music background to make a seemingly seamless transition into the music business. Dean is often incorrectly credited for compositions from Swizz Beatz,  both of which being credited as "K. Dean". He is a member of Iota Phi Theta fraternity.

Discography

2004

 Destiny's Child - "Bad Habit"

Destiny's Child album entitled 'Destiny Fulfilled' received a Grammy Nomination for Best R&B Contemporary Album 2004

2005

 112 - "Why Can't We Get Along"
 Lil' Mo - "Mother Of Your Child"
 Teairra Mari - "Phone Booth"
 Toni Braxton - "Trippin' (That's The Way Love Works)"
 Chris Brown - "Say Goodbye"
 Chris Brown - "Winner"
 Chris Brown - "One Mo' Gin"

Chris Brown's album entitled 'Chris Brown' received a Grammy Nomination for Best R&B Contemporary Album 2005

2006

 Avant - "Director"
 Danity Kane - "Back Up"
 Danity Kane - "One Shot"
 Danity Kane - "Ride For You"
 Kenny Lattimore & Chanté Moore - "Figure It Out"
 Sammie - "I Can't"
 Frankie J - "Priceless"
 Brian Mcknight - "Comfortable"
 Ciara - "So Hard"
 Mary J. Blige - "We Ride (I See The Future)"
 Mary J. Blige - "Reflections (I Remember)"
 Tyrese - "Gotta Get You"
 Omarion - "Made For TV"
 Omarion - "Just Can't Let You Go"

2007

 Marques Houston - "Circle"
 Joe - "Go Hard"
 Joe - "I Feel For You"
 Joe - "You Should Know Me"
 Bobby Valentino - "How 'Bout It"
 B5 - "Erica Kane"
 B5 - "Right To Left"
 Keyshia Cole - "Was It Worth It"
 Trey Songz - "Last Time"
 Chris Brown - "Throwed"
 Chris Brown - "This Christmas"
 Chris Brown - "Fallen Angel"
 Chris Brown - "Try A Little Tenderness"

Keyshia Cole's album entitled 'Just Like You' received a Grammy Nomination for Best R&B Contemporary Album 2007

2008

 Raheem DeVaughn - "Empty"
 Danity Kane - "Sucka For Love"
 Danity Kane - "2 Of You"
 Day26 - "Since You've Been Gone"
 Mariah Carey - "I Stay In Love"
 Usher - "Before I Met You"
 Day 26 - “Just Shoulda Told You”
 Joe - “We Need To Roll”

2009

 Ginuwine - "One Time For Love"
 Mary J. Blige - "Hood Love"
 Day 26 - “Stadium Music”
 Day 26 - “So Good”
 Day 26 - “Baby Maker”
 Yolanda Adams - “You”
 New Kids On The Block - “Coming Home”

2010

 Monica - "Superman"
 Monica - "Still Standing"
 Monica - "All I Know Is Me"
 Monica - "Lesson's Learned"

Monica's album entitled 'Still Standing' received a Grammy Nomination for Best R&B Album 2010

2011

 Jordan Knight - “Believe”
 Ginuwine - “Frozen” 
 Ginuwine - “Break” 
 Tyrese - “One Night” 
 Tyrese - “Nothing On You” 
 Tyrese - “Best In Me” 
 Tyrese - “I Miss That Girl” 
 Tyrese - “Make Love” 
 Tyrese - “It's All On Me” 
 Tyrese - “Angel” 
 Tyrese - “Home” 
 Tyrese - “Rest of Our Lives” 
 Tyrese - “Take Over” 
 Johnny Gill - “Long Long Time”
 Keke Palmer - "Facebook Stalker"

Tyrese's album entitled 'Open Invitation' received a Grammy Nomination for Best R&B Contemporary Album 2012

2012

 Q. Parker - “Show You How”
 Q. Parker - “2 Of Us”
 Q. Parker - “Yes” (interlude)

2013

 Ann Nesby - “Let It Be” 
 Ann Nesby - “This Time” 
 Ann Nesby -“Remember” 
 Ann Nesby - “Through With You”
 Ron Isley - “Let’s Be Alone” 
 Tamar Braxton - “Pieces”

2014

 Gabriel Orengo - “AyAyAy” 
 Gabriel Orengo - “Damelo”

2015

 Tyrese - “Leave” 
 Wolfgang Gartner - “You Wear Me Out”

Tyrese's album entitled 'Black Rose' received a Grammy Nomination for Best R&B Album 2015

2016

 Trevor Jackson - "Pogo"
 Avery Wilson - "Love You More"
 Oshea - L.O.T.R.
 Krishane -"DUMB"

2017

 Jonghyun - "Only One You Need"

2018

 Lei McQueen - "Good Luck"

References

Living people
Record producers from Florida
American male composers
21st-century American composers
American people of Bahamian descent
21st-century American male musicians
Year of birth missing (living people)